The 1998 Malaysian motorcycle Grand Prix was the second round of the 1998 Grand Prix motorcycle racing season. It took place on 19 April 1998 at the Johor Circuit.

500 cc classification

250 cc classification

125 cc classification

Championship standings after the race (500cc)

Below are the standings for the top five riders and constructors after round two has concluded. 

Riders' Championship standings

Constructors' Championship standings

 Note: Only the top five positions are included for both sets of standings.

References

Motorcycle Grand Prix
Malaysia
Johor Circuit
Malaysian motorcycle Grand Prix